Biblián Canton Ecuador is a canton of Ecuador, located in the Cañar Province.  Its capital is the town of Biblián.  Its population at the 2010 census was 20,500. Population has remained unchanged for the past two decades. Most of its original inhabitants have immigrated to the United States and Spain, while internal immigration from other cities in the province has helped keep the population at about 20,000 since the 1980s.

Points of interest
El Santuario de la Virgen del Rocío

References

Cantons of Cañar Province